Pellicer Creek is a stream in the U.S. state of Florida. It is a tributary to the Matanzas River, and delineates the border between St. Johns and Flagler counties in the northeastern part of the state. The creek begins as a blackwater stream in the swamps west of Interstate 95, and meanders eastward into the Matanzas River; it is part of Florida's Designated Paddling Trail System.

Pellicer Creek was named after Francisco Pellicer, an early Spanish settler. The waterway was formerly called Woodcutter's Creek, along which lumber and turpentine from a sawmill owned by British master carpenter John Hewitt were transported to the Matanzas River and then northward to St. Augustine. In 1770, Hewitt had purchased 1,000 acres of land near the Kings' Road, where he built his water-driven mill, in operation from 1770 to 1813.

References

Rivers of Florida
Rivers of Flagler County, Florida
Rivers of St. Johns County, Florida